Jacques Van Gompel (born 12 June 1947) is a Belgian politician for the Socialist Party (PS).

Political career
 1970-1976 Councilman in Gilly, (merged with Charleroi in 1976)
 1979-1983 Councilman in Charleroi
 1983-1988 Alderman (Youth & Public Works) in Charleroi
 1989-1995 First Alderman in Charleroi
 1995-2000 Acting mayor of Charleroi
 1995-2006 Mayor of Charleroi

In 1978 Van Gompel was elected as a representative for the Charleroi area in the Belgian Parliament. He resigned in 1983, in order to devote all his time to the administration of Charleroi.

Scandal
On 24 May 2006, Van Gompel offered his resignation as mayor after the mayor's office has been accused of fraud, forgery and corruption regarding public solicitations. The PS however put its trust behind Van Gompel, and he would stay on.

On 20 October 2006, Van Gompel was arrested himself, and charged with fraud and forgery. He resigned from his mayor position from jail, on 23 October 2006.

In October 2011 he was condemned to 18 months imprisonment (provisionally). However, in March 2013 the Court of Appeal granted him a complete acquittal. However, his political career was over, after he had not been a candidate for the communal elections of October 2012.

Literature
 Olivier COLLOT, Jacques Van Gompel. Un homme, une vie, une ville, Bruxelles, ed. Pire, 2006.
 Jacques Van Gompel, in: Encyclopédie du Mouvement wallon, Parlementaires et ministres de la Wallonie (1974–2009), T. IV, Namen, Institut Destrée, 2010

See also
 ICDI affair

References

External links
Jacques Van Gompel (personal site)

Belgian politicians
1947 births
Living people